This is a list of chapters for the Japanese manga series Bobobo-bo Bo-bobo and the spinoff series Shinsetsu Bobobo-bo Bo-bobo, both written and illustrated by Yoshio Sawai and serialized in Weekly Shonen Jump. The series was licensed for an English-language release in the United States and Canada by Viz Media, who chose to release a single stand alone released an interlude in the series. The volume was released under their "SJ Advanced" label on November 8, 2005. The next American release of Bobobo-bo Bo-bobo would begin serialization in Shonen Jump in July 2007 with chapter 110, with Viz then releasing the Japanese volume 11 as volume 1 under Viz's normal Shonen Jump imprint.



Volume list

Bobobo-bo Bo-bobo

Shinsetsu Bobobo-bo Bo-bobo

References

External links
 Official Viz Media Bobobo-bo Bo-bobo website

Chapters
Bobobo-bo Bo-bobo